Self-knowledge may refer to:
 Self-knowledge (psychology)
 Self-knowledge (Vedanta), a major process in the teachings of Vedanta
 "Self Knowledge", a poem by Samuel T. Coleridge centering on the Delphic maxim know thyself